Argjent Halili (born 16 November 1982) is an Albanian professional footballer who plays as a goalkeeper for Albanian club Oriku.

Club career

Kukësi
Halili signed for Kukësi on 1 July 2012. He was released from the club on 16 June 2015 following the end of 2014–15 season.

Flamurtari Vlorë
On 13 July 2015, he returned to his first club Flamurtari Vlorë by signing a one-year deal. On 23 June 2016, he agreed a contract extension with the club, signing until June 2017. On 25 November, during the league match against Vllaznia Shkodër, Halili suffered an injury and was forced to leave the field in the last moments of the match, which finished in a 0–1 home defeat. After the match, it was reported that Halili had damaged his tendons and the thigh muscle, leaving him sidelined for eight weeks. On 26 June 2016, Halili left the club by terminating his contract by mutual consent.

Kamza
On 1 August 2017, Halili joined newly promoted side Kamza by penning a one-year contract. He was allocated squad number 1, and starter the season on 9 September in the opening matchday against Kukësi, conceding from an Elis Bakaj penalty as the match finished 1–0. He continued to be starting keeper afterwards. On 30 October, in the match against Laçi which was won 0–1, Halili wore the captain armband and was named the new captain after Sebino Plaku decided to hand over captaincy. The veteran left the club in the first days of January 2018.

Oriku
In July 2018, after spending the second part of 2017–18 season as a free agent, Halili along with his former teammate Taulant Kuqi agreed to join newly promoted Albanian First Division side Oriku.

Career statistics

Honours
Flamurtari Vlorë
Albanian Cup: 2008–09

References

External links
FSHF profile

1982 births
Living people
Footballers from Vlorë
Albanian footballers
Association football goalkeepers
Flamurtari Vlorë players
KF Teuta Durrës players
KS Albpetrol Patos players
KS Sopoti Librazhd players
KS Kastrioti players
FK Kukësi players
FC Kamza players
KF Oriku players
Kategoria Superiore players
Kategoria e Parë players